The Muskwa River flows  through northern British Columbia, Canada. It is a major tributary of the Fort Nelson River - part of the Mackenzie River system. The river rises at Fern Lake in the Bedaux Pass in the Northern Rocky Mountains. From there, it flows generally east, then north, and then east again to meet with the Fort Nelson River just east of the town of Fort Nelson. From mouth to headwater, prominent tributaries include the Prophet River, Tuchodi River, and Gathto Creek. Much of the upper portions of this wilderness river and its watershed are located in the Northern Rocky Mountains Provincial Park, which is part of the larger Muskwa-Kechika Management Area. The region is a popular wilderness recreation destination.

A geological unit, the Muskwa Formation, was named for this river, as are the Muskwa Ranges, which is the name for the subgroup of the Rocky Mountains between the Peace and Liard rivers.

Tributaries
Fern Lake
Crehan Creek
Reimer Creek
Wenger Creek
Pentreath Creek
Varrick Creek
Kluachesi Creek
Beckman Creek
Tuchodi River
Chlotapecta Creek
Chischa River
Tetsa River
Gairdner Creek
Steamboat Creek
Kledo Creek
Raspberry Creek
Miduski Creek
Akue Creek
Pouce Creek
Prophet River

References

External links
BC Parks website

Muskwa River
Fort Nelson Country
Rivers of the Canadian Rockies
Peace River Land District